Phillip II, Count of Nevers (October 1389, Villaines-en-Duesmois – 25 October 1415, Agincourt) was the youngest son of Philip the Bold and Margaret III of Flanders.

He succeeded his brothers, John the Fearless, Duke of Burgundy and Anthony, Duke of Brabant, as Count of Nevers and Rethel respectively after each of them acceded to their duchies.

He married in Soissons, on 9 April 1409, Isabelle de Coucy (d. 1411), daughter of Enguerrand VII de Coucy and Isabelle of Lorraine. They had two children:
 Philip of Nevers (1410–1411/aft. 1415)
 Margaret of Nevers (1411–1411/1412)

He married again, in Beaumont-en-Artois on 20 June 1413, Bonne of Artois, daughter of Philip of Artois, Count of Eu. They had two sons:
 Charles I, Count of Nevers (1414–1464)
 John II, Count of Nevers (bef. 1415 – 1491)

He also had four illegitimate children by various mistresses.

In spite of his elder brother John's ambivalent position and ultimate refusal to come to the aid of the royal army in the face of the English invasion of Henry V in 1415, Philip was with the French army at the Battle of Agincourt, and both he and his brother Anthony were killed in the battle. He was succeeded by his son Charles.

References

References

Nevers, Philip II, Count of
Nevers, Philip II, Count of
Nevers, Philip II, Count of
Counts of Nevers
House of Valois-Burgundy-Nevers
Never, Philip II, Count of